A protein-sparing modified fast or PSMF diet is a type of a very-low-calorie diet (<800 kcal per day) with a high proportion of protein calories and simultaneous restriction of carbohydrate and fat. It includes a protein component, fluids, and vitamin and mineral supplementation.

PSMF diets can last for up to 6 months, followed by a gradual increase in calories over 6–8 weeks.

Description

A PSMF attempts to spare the dieter the health risks of a complete fast by introducing the minimum amount of protein necessary to prevent muscle-wasting effects, while still eliminating fats and carbohydrates.  Typically, depending on activity level, 0.8–1.2 g of protein per pound of lean body mass (not total body weight) is consumed. Protein beyond this minimum amount is also eliminated, as the body would use it for energy in a process called gluconeogenesis. Further lean body mass (muscle, organs, etc.) are spared through resistance training and limiting aerobic activity.

History

The Last Chance Diet

The concept of "protein-sparing modified fast" (PSMF) was described by George Blackburn in the early 1970s as an intensive weight-loss diet designed to mitigate the harms associated with protein-calorie malnutrition  and nitrogen losses induced by either acute illness or hypocaloric diets in patients with obesity, in order to adapt the patient's metabolism sufficiently to use endogenous fat stores as well as to preserve the protein contained in the body cell mass.

The "liquid protein" PSMF diet described in the book The Last Chance Diet in 1976, motivates that the liquid protein diets of varying composition became widely popular. Three years later, in 1979, Isner published a report of 17 deaths associated with low-quality liquid protein VLCD, due to heart-related causes. These serious effects caused a substantial concern about the safety of clinical use of PSMF and VLCD. As a result, a review was published that highlighted the differences with these low-quality liquid protein diets and emphasized the importance of close medical monitoring during the fast and refeeding periods.

Modern PSMF diets
Instead of hydrolyzed collagen, modern medically supervised PSMF diets include foods of higher biological value, such as meat, fish, eggs, cheese, and/or tofu. PSMF is used as a treatment for highly motivated patients to achieve rapid weight loss and usually is administered for 6 – 16 weeks.

Before an individual starts a PSMF diet, their doctor should order an electrocardiogram, to check for signs of heart disease and also will prescribe specific vitamins minerals and electrolytes to be taken daily as long as the diet persists.

See also

 Atkins diet: a low-carbohydrate diet
 Dukan Diet: a high-protein, low-carbohydrate, low-fat diet
 Fasting
 Intermittent fasting
 Low-carbohydrate diet
 Stillman diet: a high-protein, low-carbohydrate, low-fat diet

References

Diets
Fasting
Proteins as nutrients
Fad diets

fr:Régime protal
nl:Dukan-dieet
pl:Dieta proteinowa